We Come in Peace with a Message of Love is a 1985 album by Curtis Mayfield.

Track listing
All songs written by Curtis Mayfield, except where noted.

Personnel
Curtis Mayfield - vocals, guitar, Linn drum sequencing 
Edward Gregory, Joseph "Lucky" Scott, Bobby Eli, Norman Harris - guitar
Tracy Mayfield, Joseph "Lucky" Scott, Jimmy Williams - bass
William Green, Carlton Kent, Eugene Curry, Buzz Amaro - keyboards
Theodis Rodgers - piano, Prophet V synthesizer
Earl Young, Morris Jennings - drums
Glen "Bongo" Davis, Master Henry Gibson - congas
Hank Ford - saxophone
Nella Rigell-Colson - harp

Curtis Mayfield albums
1985 albums
Albums produced by Norman Harris
Albums produced by Curtis Mayfield
Curtom Records albums